Spherical is a 1989 video game published by Rainbow Arts. It was released for the Amiga, Amstrad CPC, Atari ST, and ZX Spectrum.

Gameplay
Spherical is a game in which the player must guide a glowing Starball through an obstacle-filled room to the exit.

Reception
Allen L. Greenberg reviewed the game for Computer Gaming World, and stated that "For an arcade game, Spherical contains an unusual degree of strategy. This alone sets the game apart from others. For an interesting challenge of both thought and reflexes, get Spherical!"

Tom Malcom for .info rated the game 5 stars and said "First rate in every way, the game even has a cooperative two-player mode with a different set of screens. Don't miss it."

Reviews
Compute's Amiga Resource - Jun, 1990
ASM (Aktueller Software Markt) - Apr, 1989
The Games Machine - Aug, 1989
Sinclair User - Dec, 1989

References

External links
Spherical at Atari Mania
Spherical at Spectrum Computing

1989 video games
Amiga games
Amstrad CPC games
Atari ST games
Commodore 64 games
Fantasy video games
Puzzle-platform games
Rainbow Arts games
Video games developed in Germany
ZX Spectrum games